Craspediopsis is a genus of moths in the family Geometridae.

Species
 Craspediopsis bimaculata Warren, 1895
 Craspediopsis pallivittata (Moore, [1868])

References
 Craspediopsis at Markku Savela's Lepidoptera and Some Other Life Forms
 Natural History Museum Lepidoptera genus database

Sterrhinae
Geometridae genera